The 1959 Mitropa Cup was the 19th season of the Mitropa football club tournament. It was won by Honvéd who beat MTK in the two-legged final 6–5 on aggregate.

Quarter-finals

|}

Semi-finals

|}

Finals

|}

References

1959
1959–60 in European football
1959–60 in Austrian football
1959–60 in Czechoslovak football
1959–60 in Hungarian football
1959–60 in Yugoslav football